"Добрий вечір, тобі ..." (Good Evening To You) is a compilation EP by Ruslana, released in 2002. On this compilation EP, Ruslana presents the Christmas hits of the Ukrainian stars: Ruslana, Yevhenia Vlasova, Ani Lorak, Viktor Pavlik, Haydamaky, Oleksandr Ponomariov, and Taras Chubay.

Track listing
 "Dobryi vechir" (Dmytro Tsyperdiuk version) (Ruslana)
 "Mykolai Borodatyi" (Taras Chubay)
 "Syple snih" (Yevhenia Vlasova)
 "Rizdvo, Rizdvo" (Ani Lorak)
 "Nova Radist'" (Viktor Pavlik)
 "Misyats'" (Taisiya Povaliy)
 "Sviat vechir" (Haydamaky)
 "Dobryi vechir" (DJ Nekrasov version) (Ruslana)
 "Raduisya, svit" (Oleksandr Ponomariov)
 "Utishymosya" (Ruslana, Pikkardiyska Tertsiya, Taras Chubay)
 "Zyma" (Ani Lorak, Viktor Pavlik, Oleksandr Ponomariov, Ruslana, Taras Chubay)
 "Tykha Nich" (Ruslana)
 "Dobryi vechir" (original) (Ruslana)

Charts

Ruslana albums

cs:Diskografie Ruslany#Dobryj večir, tobi…